USS Rabaul (CVE/CVHE/AKV-21) was a  of the United States Navy. She was delivered on 30 August 1946, but never commissioned. After spending 26 years in reserve, she was scrapped in 1973.

History
Rabaul was laid down 29 January 1945 by Todd Pacific Shipyards, Tacoma, Washington, launched 14 June 1945, sponsored by Alice Schade (wife of United States Navy naval architect Commodore Henry Adrian "Packy" Schade), completed by the Commercial Iron Works, Portland, Oregon, and delivered to the Navy 30 August 1946. Rabaul was named for Rabaul, a strategically significant port in the Pacific theater of World War II.

Accepted into the 19th Fleet, (the Pacific Reserve Fleet), Rabaul was berthed at Tacoma without seeing any active service. The warship was mothballed there during the early years of the Cold War and served as a mobilization reserve in case of war with the Soviet Union. Reclassified CVHE-121 in June 1955, she was transferred to the San Diego Group, Pacific Reserve Fleet in June 1958 and reclassified AKV-21 in May of the following year.  She remained in reserve at San Diego until 1 September 1971 when she was struck from the Naval Vessel Register.  Rabaul was sold on 25 August 1972 to the Nicolai Joffe Corporation of Beverly Hills, California, for scrapping at its San Francisco Bay area facility in Richmond, California, the former Kaiser Shipbuilding Yard No. 3. Shortly before scrapping, it was used in the closing scenes of the 1973 movie Magnum Force.

References

External links
 Photo gallery at navsource.org

Commencement Bay-class escort carriers
1945 ships